The Seymour Railway Heritage Centre (SRHC) is a railway preservation group based in Seymour, Victoria, Australia. The volunteer non-profit incorporated association was established in 1983 as the Seymour Loco Steam Preservation Group to restore and preserve locomotives and rolling stock as used on the railways of Victoria.

The group is an accredited railway operator under the Victorian Rail Safety Act 2006, permitting it to move trains within its own depot. The group is also accredited to maintain and provide rolling stock on the Victorian railway network, running charters, tourist and railfan specials across the state with their fleet of restored trains. It was also a provider of locomotives to freight operator, Qube.

Fleet

The Seymour Railway Heritage Centre is the custodian of a number of heritage pieces of rolling stock owned by the Victorian Government (by either VicTrack or V/Line), which are on a permanent lease basis as well as other rolling stock owned outright.

Locomotives in the custody of the group include steam locomotives J515, mainline diesels C501, S303, X31 and B74 and a number of smaller branchline T class locomotives, (T320, T357 & T378). Also 600 hp diesel railcar DRC43.

Locomotives owned by the group are: GM36, T378, T382, K176 & J512.

Carriages in the group's collection include 1906 E type wooden sitting and sleeping carriages as used on the Adelaide Express and The Overland, the majority of the original 1937 Spirit of Progress consist, and carriages used on Victorian Railways Royal Trains.

In 2007, the Seymour Railway Heritage Centre was provided with funding from the VicTrack Heritage Program for the restoration of the Spirit of Progress consist and heritage diesel locomotives B74 and S303, and on 25 November 2007 a commemorative run was made for the 70th anniversary of the first Spirit of Progress service.

New additions
In late August 2009, locomotives S310 and T382 were transferred to Seymour and became part of the SRHC collection. Both units were delivered in a non-operational state with T382 being the first to undergo re-activation as well as a full bodywork overhaul and repaint into the Victorian Railways blue and gold livery and ran its first tour on 18 December 2021 to Tocumwal, New South Wales. Restoration of S310 has been put on hold and will be restored at a later date.

In early January 2010, X31 was transferred to Seymour and became part of the SRHC collection. This event made X31 the first of its class to enter preservation. 31 underwent a full bodywork overhaul and repaint into Victorian Railways blue and gold livery, then entered traffic as a heritage unit on hire to El Zorro in March 2011. Until the transfer to Seymour, X31 was part of the Pacific National fleet and had spent many months in storage.

In early 2012, the SRHC purchased diesel locomotive GM28 (displayed as GM22) and three carriages located in Port Pirie, South Australia. Two of the carriages being sitting lounges and one a kitchen and dining area (All carriages have been burnt and vandalised after the train was moved behind a building in 2009). The group paid $33,000 in total, the train is still sitting at Port Pirie station until it can be removed. Trashed former display locomotive GM28 masquerading as GM22 departed Port Pirie bound for the Seymour Railway Heritage Centre, 26 June 2012. The trashed carriages have been moved out onto railway land out near Coonamia.

In August 2017, ex-Pacific National locomotive X37 was transferred over to Seymour and has become part of the SRHC collection. This event sees the second X class locomotive to enter preservation and X37 is the class leader of the subclass second series X class locomotive which had preserved. As of August 2019, X37 is still in Freight Australia livery and is not in an operational condition, as time and finances permit, X37 will be restored back into traffic within the near future.

In June 2020, VicTrack Heritage allocated locomotive A60 to the SRHC collection. This event sees the First Mainline Diesel Electric Locomotive for the Victorian Railways preserved and retained for future generations. A60 is the class leader of the A Class Locomotives and formerly the B Class Locomotive (prior to its rebuild). As of April 2021, A60 is still in its V/Line Red and Blue livery and is not in an operational condition, A60 will be restored back into traffic within the near future. A60 has been also been nominated and formally enlisted to be an asset of significant Victorian State Heritage for being the first mainline diesel electric locomotive to the Victorian Railways.

Rolling stock

Locomotives

Carriages and vans

See also
Seymour railway station
Tourist and Heritage Railways Act

References

External links 
http://www.srhc.org.au - Official Site

Heritage railways in Australia
Railway museums in Victoria (Australia)